Statistics of Southern New England Soccer League in season 1917-18.

League standings
Participating teams:

 Fall River Rovers
 Pan-American FC
 New Bedford Whalers
 New Bedford Celtics
 Fore River Shipbuilding Company Stars
 J&P Coats
 Crompton FC
 Greystone FC
 Lonsdale FC

The season was called off late in the spring; many games had been
cancelled due to poor weather, and many teams were away for extended
periods due to their progress in the American Cup and National Challenge Cup
competitions. J&P Coats won the league title.

References
Southern New England Soccer League (RSSSF)

1917-18
1917–18 domestic association football leagues
1917–18 in American soccer